The following is the solo discography of Susumu Hirasawa, Japanese musician and composer. Since the beginning of his professional activities in 1973, Hirasawa has produced a prolific number of recordings, with a constant stream of releases since 1978, under his own name as well as multiple bands and side projects. See Mandrake (Japanese band), P-Model and Shun (band) for more output.

Original albums

Mini-albums

1  The track "Ruktun or Die" was a limited-time offer, and was taken out of sale in January 2002.
2  Five of the seven ringtones were released by twenty2product on their website for free under the name "22p_rto01".

Soundtracks
Besides the works listed below, he also contributed pieces for the anime X-Bomber (see "other projects").

1  Hirasawa only made sound effects for the show, and only worked on it for about a year.
2  A jingle for a radio/TV/cassette recorder combo. Performed with Yasumi Tanaka. Broadcast 1980. Never officially released.
3  Choshu's theme, is credited to "Hanmyō Ibo" for writing, a play on the Japanese word for "beetle" picked by happenstance; and "Z.Z.Z." for performance. Disowned by Hirasawa. Included on multiple subsequent wrestling over the decades, Hirasawa's recording only appears on King releases. Various artists have covered the song, including Ken Ishii. André's theme is attributed to E-Project.
4  A collection of ten assorted commercial jingles for Shiseido, Tama-Plaza, Matsuzakaya/Kansai Yamamoto, Sony, Nestlé/Nescafé, Teijin and Marui. Six variations of a jingle for Matsuden Home Shopping by Teruo Nakano are also included. Released as a bonus for the first volume of the Moire Club newsletter.
5  Writing and performance are credited to "Yoshio Fukurai", a tribute to Tomokichi Fukurai. Out of the album's eleven tracks, "Furukai" is only present on the title track.
6  Aired once by KTV, who co-produced it with Toho, on 2 February 1987. Based on the 1974 Seiichi Morimura suspense novel of the same name. Hirasawa made its backing music, Shin'ichi Sako made the sound effects and the theme song was done by George Winston.
7  A month before the release of the first episode, Polydor released a "making of" tape titled Detonator Orgun 0, containing an interview with Hirasawa and clips of a press conference he participated with others in the anime's staff.
It was originally broadcast on 29 April 1992 and later re-edited for home video release (released 25 January 1993 on VHS and LaserDisc). Hirasawa appears in the TV edit paddling a canoe. The soundtrack has never had an official standalone release: The title track was originally released on Root of Spirit -Essence of Hirasawa Solo Works- and Music for Movies - Great Movie Sounds of Susumu Hirasawa compilations, while the only release of the soundtrack proper is on Disc 11 of the Haldyn Dome box set, 20 years after the documentary aired.
When it premiered, the soundtrack could be only bought from the park's gift shops.
11  A short movie about the JR Shinjuku Station. The soundtrack has never had an official standalone release; the only kind of sound played on the short (which bears some resemblance to Syun's "Kun Mae #4" from 1996's Kun Mae on a Calculation) was originally released on Illegal Dumping (spelt "Densha", see "other releases"), it was later released with other twenty2product collaborations and remaining tracks on Disc 16 of the Haldyn Dome box set (spelt "densha").
12  An Artdink PlayStation RPG. Hirasawa only composed and performed the opening theme: . Originally released on From Hirasawa: Solo Songs Not on CD (see "other releases"), a live performance with a new arrangement is included on the Phonon 2553 Vision DVD, a studio recording of that (named "2010 version") is included with other miscellaneous tracks on Disc 16 of the Haldyn Dome box set.
13  A looping presentation on alternative energy, part of the "Hirasawa Energy Works" project. The soundtrack has never had an official standalone release. The audio, recorded during a surge of "Surplus Power" (see "other releases") was originally released on Hirasawa's Phantom Notes website (named "LOOP The Sound Track β1"). It was later released with other twenty2product collaborations and remaining tracks on Disc 16 of the Haldyn Dome box set (named "loop").
14  MMORPG developed by Sega originally for the Dreamcast, moved to the Xbox after the discontinuation of the former console, and ultimately cancelled. The exact extent of Hirasawa's involvement is unknown; one track ("Nation-F") saw release on the Music For Movies～World of Susumu Hirasawa Soundtracks compilation.
15  Hirasawa only composed and performed the boot jingle: "Eastern-boot". Two additional tracks were included on the AmigaOS 4.0 CD to showcase Hirasawa's music. The jingle was later released in the FAMIGA (Japanese Amiga community involved with Hirasawa) forums and with Hirasawa's Near Future Never Come e-book.
16  The soundtrack has never had an official standalone release; the only kind of sound played on the short was originally released on Live Byakkoya – White Tiger Field Memorial Package (named "Bonus Spot"), it was later released with other twenty2product collaborations and remaining tracks on Disc 16 of the HALDYN DOME box set (named "IDN").
17  The soundtrack has never had an official standalone release.
18  Hirasawa only composed and performed the opening theme "Sign" and the ending theme "Sign-2", two different arrangements of the same song.
19  Production on the film was halted for financial and artistic reasons following the death of director Satoshi Kon. Only a few scene/song combinations were set by Kon before his death. Hirasawa made some music for the film.
20  A collection of various songs by Hirasawa and PEVO 1go from their careers that have been edited to serve as film score to be freely used by independent media and free-lance journalists delivering news via the Internet.
21  Hirasawa only composed and performed the theme song: "Aria". While there have been soundtrack releases for the films, none of them include Hirasawa's work. "Aria" was originally a single-only release; it was then included in the Ash Crow compilation 5 years later, with the single CD being discontinued.
22  The Japanese home video release of the film includes a live performance of "Aria" from Hirasawa's "Phonon 2555" concert tour (when that tour's DVD was released, this same performance was included, but with alternative angles overlaid on top of the version on this DVD). Video of a public appearance made by Hirasawa, the trilogy's director and voice actors of the main characters to promote the third film, The Advent, was included in its Japanese home video release.
23  Hirasawa only composed and performed the insert songs "Ashes" and "Ash Crow". Both were first released in Ash Crow (see "rearrangement albums").

Songs licensed for soundtracks 

1  A promotional release to commemorate the fifth anniversary of the laserdisc by Pioneer, who commissioned Australian video artist to make a video for the song to be included.
2  Instead of featuring any of the recordings Hirasawa made of the song, the film uses a cover sung by two of its main actors (Ryuya Wakaba and Asuka Hinoi).

Unidentified jingles 
From 1983 to 1990, Hirasawa worked on various commercials. Unlike most of the soundtracks listed above, Hirasawa undertook these less out of artistic interest and more out of financial necessity. Outside of those included on Model House Works, most of these jingles have never been officially released and not precisely identified—by Hirasawa or his fanbase—but among his clients were companies like Denon, Japan Tobacco, Kirin, Mazda, Mizuno, NTT,  (rearranging another musician's jingle), Rado, Snow Brand Milk Products, TV Asahi, Unicharm and Volvo. After he acquired an Amiga, he took on a handful jobs making both music and CGI with Takara,  and HTB. Beyond broadcast work, he also contributed to installations like the Optic Fiber Clock (located on the Bellvia mall near Chino Station, plays a unique Hirasawa song centred on bird chirps once an hour 10 times a day; originally featured karakuri puppet birds that moved in sync with the chirps),  automated teller machines, a closing time tune for a Shinjuku cake shop and synthesizer sound effects to make a Korakuen Amusement Park rollercoaster scary.

Rearrangement albums

1  Also a compilation album.

Live memorial packages
Collections of studio recordings of rearrangements and/or original songs made for live shows.

1  The English version of his website only allows the purchase of one song from this album, "Aurora 3".

Live albums

Other releases

1  This is a series of recordings of a weekly  half-hour radio show that Hirasawa hosted. It lasted 39 broadcasts, divided in 12 volumes, released in sets of 4 tapes.

Singles

1  Solo rerecording of 1990 collaboration (see "various artists compilations"). Fanclub members can download it and a karaoke mix for free.

Free MP3 samples
Hirasawa has semi-regularly uploaded snippets of album tracks ever since the start of professional activities online, and after going independent, regularly releases one track from an album free of charge, effectively serving the same purpose of a single in promoting the parent album.

Albumless free MP3s

1  Performed as "Stealthman". Limited-time release, removed from No Room on 29 June 2011. Came with lyrics on text file. An instrumental mix, also received a limited-time release (uploaded 29 June 2011, removed 4 July 2011). Both allowed re-distribution.

Various artists compilations

1  Also included in Mandrake's Unreleased Materials Vol. 2.
2  Lyrics co-written with Masami Orimo. Performed by "Susumu Hirasawa with "; vocals by Shimazaki. Also included in the compilations "20th anniversary BOX", "for winter music Lovers ～ TECHNO POP Xmas" and "Archetype | 1989～1995 Polydor years of Hirasawa". Rerecorded solo for Christmas 2014 (see "singles").
3  Group of songs released as prizes for winning a browser game.

Compilations

Videos

1  Mixture of concert footage and explanations of the technical aspect behind an Interactive Live Show.
2  Mixture of concert footage and Q&A sessions.

Non-concert videos

As Kaku P-Model
"Hybrid" releases, containing both solo and P-Model material, are listed elsewhere (see "live albums" and "videos").

Albums

Free MP3 samples

Live memorial packages

Videos

Remixes

Other projects

1  Although Hirasawa is considered a core member of the group, he only worked on the track "Parallel Motives".
2  This album is a remix album of "Drive" made by Roedelius and Bickley, including a remix of "Parallel Motives".
3  Paterson did "Parallel Motives II", a re-remix-crossfade of the "Parallel Motives" remix.

Collaborations

1  Performed with Mandrake.
2  This record was included with a magazine that had an opinion piece by Hirasawa on Tony Banks published in it.
3  Performed with Mandrake. Covers of the entrance themes of Abdullah the Butcher and Jumbo Tsuruta.
4  Credited under "Special Thanks", alongside P-Model keyboardist Yasumi Tanaka, who appears in the track .
5  "Tonight" was also included in the compilation "TECHNOLOID 〜JAPANESE 80's NEW WAVE SAMPLER〜" (which also includes the P-Model song "Art Mania").  was also included in the compilation "Impossibles! ~ 80's JAPANESE PUNK & NEW WAVE" (which also includes the "Countless Answers" version of the P-Model song "Atom-Siberia").
6  Released with the magazine "ING, O! No.5". Act name given as "Michiro Endo + Susumu Hirasawa + Korechika Kitada + Jun Inui". The only track was also included in the compilation "KI-GA KI-GA KI-KYO".
7  Rerecording of the P-Model song of the same name from the album "Scuba". with new arrangement & guitar lines.
8  Fellow P-Model member Shunichi Miura also plays keyboards on all tracks.
9  Those tracks were also included in the compilations "TWIN ～ VERY BEST COLLECTION" and "TEICHIKU WORKS – 30th anniversary".
10  The tracks with vocals were included in the compilations "TWIN ～ VERY BEST COLLECTION", "TOGAWA LEGEND – SELF SELECT BEST & RARE 1979～2008" and "TEICHIKU WORKS – 30th anniversary". The title track was included in the compilation "Sanagika no Onna: Mika Ninagawa Selection" and its music video was included in the 2002 and 2012 reissues of the video "Yapoos Keikaku" and the compilation "TEICHIKU WORKS – 30th anniversary". All tracks exclusive to this release are included in reissues of Shōwa Kyōnen.
11  "Memento Mori" was also included in the compilation "GROOVIN' Shōwa! 7 ～ Romantist".
12  This song was included in the compilation "TOGAWA LEGEND – SELF SELECT BEST & RARE 1979～2008".
13  Remixed with fellow P-Model member Hajime Fukuma.
14  A cover of a P-Model song of the same name from the album Perspective (the original's lyrics were written by Hirasawa and Tanaka and the music was composed by Tanaka). The entire album's lyrics are sung in the PEVO language, which was created by the band (a dictionary can be found in the booklet) and some of them sung by a pitch-shifted Hirasawa, who wasn't credited for either lyrics or vocals, but was credited for production as "Volquice Proladuke".
15  "Mother" was included in the compilation "Best Collection ~ Meccha Best".
16  Hirasawa would later re-record this song 5 times, with himself on vocals.
17  Co-written with Yuiko. Co-Credited under the pseudonym "Shirō Sakata".
18  Also included in the album .
19  Credited as "Volquice Proladuke".

References
Citations

Bibliography
 .
 .
 .

Rock music discographies
Electronic music discographies
Discographies of Japanese artists